Spring Hill Cemetery may refer to:

Spring Hill Cemetery (Easton, Maryland)
Spring Hill Cemetery (Marlborough, Massachusetts)
Spring Hill Cemetery (Nashville, Tennessee)
Spring Hill Cemetery Historic District, in Charleston, West Virginia

See also
Spring Hill (disambiguation)